Energy Technology is a monthly peer-reviewed scientific journal covering applied energy research. It was established in 2013 and is published by Wiley-VCH.

Abstracting and indexing 
The journal is abstracted and indexed in:

According to the Journal Citation Reports, the journal has a 2021 impact factor of 4.149, ranking it 72nd out of 119 journals in the category "Energy & Fuels".

References

External links 
 

Publications established in 2013
Energy and fuel journals
Wiley-VCH academic journals
English-language journals
Monthly journals